Futebol Clube Vila Clotilde is an Angolan basketball club based in Luanda. Being one of the most traditional and ancient basketball clubs in the country, the club was founded as an affiliate to Portugal's F.C. Barreirense and currently features the sports of basketball and karate, of which the former has been a regular contestant at the Angolan Basketball League.

During the colonial period, the club has won the district basketball championship of Angola ten times.

Roster

Players

2014–2018

See also
BIC Basket
Federação Angolana de Basquetebol

References

External links
ULA official website
Facebook profile
Africabasket profile

Sports clubs in Angola
Basketball teams in Angola
1953 establishments in Angola
Basketball teams established in 1953